Lake Gratiot is a  lake in Keweenaw County, Michigan. The lake is surrounded by dense forest of the Keweenaw Peninsula. The lake flows through the Little Gratiot River into Lac La Belle and then into Lake Superior.

See also 
 List of lakes in Michigan

References

Gratiot
Geography of Keweenaw County, Michigan